Ariane Moffatt (born 26 April 1979) is a Canadian singer-songwriter. Known for working across multiple musical genres, Moffatt's music combines elements of electronica, jazz, folk, and pop. A francophone, she is bilingual and has recorded tracks in both French and English. Her 2002 debut album Aquanaute went platinum in Quebec, earning 11 nominations at the 2003 ADISQ Awards and winning three Félix awards (for Discovery of the Year, Album of the Year – Pop/Rock, and Album Producer of the Year). She is known in Quebec for two well-received singles from Aquanaute: "La barricade" and "Dans un océan".

Early life
Moffatt grew up in Saint-Romuald, a suburb of Quebec City on the south shore of the St. Lawrence River. After completing Grade 11, she moved to Montreal where she earned a Diplôme d'études collégiales in music at Cégep de Saint-Laurent, then a Baccalauréat in popular music and classical singing from UQAM.

Career

After university, Moffatt went on tour with singer Marc Déry. This led to an invitation in 2001 from singer-songwriter Daniel Bélanger to join his band as a keyboardist and vocalist in support of his well-received album Rêver mieux. Her debut solo album Aquanaute was released in 2002 on the Audiogram label in Canada and on the EMI/Virgin label in Europe in 2005.

In 2004, Moffatt met French rock musician Matthieu Chedid at Montreal's FrancoFolies music and performance festival. She subsequently remixed Chedid's "La Bonne Étoile" (from his 2003 album Qui de nous deux) as a virtual duet. Her version of the popular song received wide airplay in France and helped introduce her to French music fans. The track was scheduled to be included on a future re-release of Aquanaute.

In 2005, Moffatt released her first music DVD, Ariane Moffatt à la Station C, which received a 2006 Juno Award nomination for Music DVD of the Year. Her second album, Le cœur dans la tête (meaning Heart in the Head) was released later that year.

Moffatt opened for French musician Alain Souchon at the Olympia (a Montreal theatre and concert venue) in 2006.

Moffatt collaborated with Franco-Israeli singer-songwriter Yael Naim on her 2008 release Tous les sens (meaning All the Senses), which was awarded Francophone Album of the Year at the 2009 Juno Awards. She also contributed vocals to the song "Sweet Light" on Tales from the City, the second album from Montreal alternative band Mobile.

In 2010, Moffatt contributed twelve tracks (all covers of English-language songs) to the popular Radio-Canada medical show Trauma, which were subsequently released as a soundtrack album. Songs included "Everybody Hurts" by R.E.M., Leonard Cohen's "In My Secret Life" and "Hallelujah", and Martha Wainwright's "Far Away". Montreal's Hour alternative newsweekly declared that Moffatt "owns these songs so hard you have to wonder if anyone will ever be able to pry them away from her". The soundtrack went on to reach Gold status in Canada. That same year she was nominated for "Best Breakthrough Live Act of the Year" at France's Victoires de la Musique awards.

Moffatt's fourth album, MA (the title references both the Japanese concept of negative space and Moffatt's initials) was released in 2012. It marked the first time the singer has composed songs in English. In an interview with Hour Moffatt explained that the effort had been inspired by her surroundings: "My studio is in Mile End, I live nearby as well, the neighbourhood is bilingual and so is the music scene I'm attracted to, which is very palpable around here," she told Hour. "I was looking for a space to compose, somewhere inspiring and luminous. I was on a kind of sabbatical, exploring and playing around, with no deadline to make an album. I was just composing and recording here in my little bubble, all by myself. I ended up with a bunch of songs, half of them in English, half in French."

Moffatt was a judge on season 1 of La voix and returned for season 4.

Moffatt has also performed in the group Louve, with Salomé Leclerc, Marie-Pierre Arthur, Amylie and Laurence Lafond-Beaulne. 
In March 2019, she was one of 11 singers from Quebec, alongside Ginette Reno, Diane Dufresne, Céline Dion, Isabelle Boulay, Luce Dufault, Louise Forestier, Laurence Jalbert, Catherine Major, Marie Denise Pelletier and Marie-Élaine Thibert, who participated in a supergroup recording of Renée Claude's 1971 single "Tu trouveras la paix" after Claude's diagnosis with Alzheimer's disease was announced.

Personal life
On 26 February 2012, Moffatt came out as lesbian in an interview with Guy Lepage on the popular Quebec talk show Tout le monde en parle. On 14 February 2013, Moffatt announced that her fiancée was pregnant with twins, due for summer 2013.

Discography

Studio albums

Live albums

Videography
 2002: "Point de mire"
 2003: "La Barricade"
 2003: "Poussière d'ange"
 2004: "Fracture du crâne"
 2005: "Hasard"
 2005: À la station C (DVD)
 2006: "Montréal"
 2008: "Réverbère"
 2009: "Jeudi, 17 mai"
 2009: "Je veux tout"
 2012: "Mon Corps"
 2012: "In Your Body"
 2012: "Too Late"
 2015: "Debout"

References

External links

  Ariane Moffatt official site

1979 births
Audiogram (label) artists
People from Lévis, Quebec
Canadian singer-songwriters
Juno Award for Francophone Album of the Year winners
Canadian lesbian musicians
Canadian LGBT singers
Canadian LGBT songwriters
Living people
Singers from Quebec
French-language singers of Canada
Université du Québec à Montréal alumni
Canadian women pop singers
French Quebecers
Lesbian singers
Lesbian songwriters
21st-century Canadian women singers
20th-century Canadian LGBT people
21st-century Canadian LGBT people